"Shambala" is a song written by Daniel Moore and made famous by two near-simultaneous releases in 1973: the better-known but slightly later recording by Three Dog Night, which reached No. 3 on the Billboard Hot 100, and a version by B. W. Stevenson. Its title derives from a mythical place-name also spelled Shamballa or Shambhala.

Lyrics
The song's actual lyrics are about the mythical kingdom of Shambhala, which was said to be hidden somewhere within or beyond the peaks of the Himalayas and was mentioned in various ancient texts, including the Kalachakra Tantra and ancient texts of Tibetan Buddhism. The original location was a mystic temple in Peru, specifically, the temple of the White Lodge, according to Alice Bailey's A Treatise on White Magic (1934), cited by Moore.

The lyrics refer to a situation where kindness and cooperation are universal, joy and good fortune abound, and psychological burdens are lifted.

The phrases "in the halls of Shambala" and "on the road to Shambala" tie for number of occurrences in the lyrics. The latter phrase perhaps alludes to the idea of Shambala not as a physical place but as a metaphor for the spiritual path one might follow.

Three Dog Night version 
The well-known cover version of this song by the rock band Three Dog Night appeared in 1973 on the Billboard Hot 100, on the top 40 from the beginning of June through the end of August, reaching No. 3 in both the pop singles and adult contemporary categories, No. 1 on the Cashbox Magazine charts, and an isolated week at No. 1 on WLS. Headed toward the Hot 100's summit in late July, had it not run out of steam, "Shambala" would have completed an uncommon distinction of a Hot 100 chart-topper for each of four consecutive years for the group.  The song, the first one that the group had specifically cut as a single, rather than an album cut, later appeared on Cyan, Three Dog Night's ninth album, and subsequently on numerous anthologies and compilation albums.

Although the lyrics of "Shambala" draw on a theme from Eastern mysticism, AllMusic notes the "very strong gospel feeling" of the album Cyan is most evident on this song. This comment may be based on both the instrumentation, including the characteristic gospel keyboard organ sounds that accompany the chorus, which features the repeated, unmistakable dog howls for which the group was long famous, and the bluesy vocals of Cory Wells. Allmusic calls this hit single "one of the group's finest later period records."

In the original recording, writer Daniel Moore pronounces the first syllable of the title ("sham") as it would rhyme with "ham." The Three Dog Night and B.W. Stevenson versions pronounce that syllable to rhyme with "mom."

B. W. Stevenson version
One week before Three Dog Night's version appeared on the charts, Texan singer-songwriter B. W. Stevenson's minute-shorter version bowed at No. 96 and later peaked at No. 66 the week of June 9. It also reached No. 31 on the U.S. Adult Contemporary chart. This lesser-known version is often regarded as country pop or country rock and appears on collections of such. The twang of Stevenson's steel-string acoustic guitar, his Southern accent and an American folk music sound all distinguish it from the better-known Three Dog Night version. In South Africa, Stevenson's version actually charted higher, peaking at No. 8, compared to Three Dog Night's No. 13.

Chart performance (Three Dog Night version)

Weekly charts

Year-end charts

Certifications

Other versions

Despite having two successful incarnations in the same year (one of which has remained a classic rock standard), few other artists have covered the song including:
 Rockapella covered it twice, once in 1997 for their album Primer and again in 2002 for their album Smilin.
 The New Seekers recorded a version in the 1970s; however, it only appeared on their 1992 compilation, Greatest Hits [Masters].
 South African musician Dr Victor recorded a dance version of "Shambala" that was a worldwide hit in 1994.
 The Skeptics also recorded a power pop version of the song on their 1994 CD, Be Satisfied.
 Country singer Toby Keith issued a live recording of "Shambala" as a bonus track on the deluxe version of his 2011 album Clancy's Tavern.
 The South African trio Mark Haze (from Idols South Africa season seven), Dozi and Ghapi recorded a version on their album Rocking Buddies in 2013.
 The Switzerland based band Light Food covered "Shambala" on their 2016 album Party Approved.

References

1973 songs
1973 singles
Songs written by Daniel Moore (musician)
B. W. Stevenson songs
Three Dog Night songs
The New Seekers songs
Toby Keith songs
Cashbox number-one singles
Number-one singles in New Zealand
Tibetan Buddhist mythology
Tibetan Buddhist art and culture
Dunhill Records singles
Buddhism in music